Abuna Mattheos (Matewos) X (1843–1926) was a Coptic priest from Egypt, who came to Ethiopia in 1881, becoming a bishop of Shewa under King Sahle Mariam. When Sahle Mariam became the Emperor of Ethiopia under the regnal name Menelik II in 1889, Mattheos then became Archbishop of the Ethiopian Orthodox Tewahedo Church until his death.

In 1916, on behalf of the Ethiopian church, Mattheos announced the dethronement and excommunication of the uncrowned Emperor of Ethiopia Lij Iyasu (Iyasu V), who reportedly converted to Islam.

References 

1843 births
1926 deaths
Archbishops of Ethiopia
19th-century Oriental Orthodox bishops
19th century in Ethiopia
20th-century Oriental Orthodox bishops
20th century in Ethiopia
Egyptian emigrants to Ethiopia